The career of American former tennis player Pete Sampras started when he turned professional in 1988 and lasted until his official retirement in August 2003. During his career Sampras played in 265 official tournaments and won 64 singles titles, including 14 titles at Grand Slam events. He competed in 16 ties for the United States Davis Cup team between 1991 and 2002 and was a member of the cup winning team in 1992 and 1995. Sampras reached the No. 1 ranking on April 12, 1993 and in total held that position for 286 weeks, third behind Novak Djokovic at 373 weeks and Roger Federer at 310 weeks. He finished the year as the No. 1 ranked player six consecutive times. His career win–loss record is 762–222 (77.4%). 

Sampras is 7–0 in Wimbledon finals and is the only male player to win 3 or more consecutive Wimbledon titles twice in his career (1993–1995, 1997–2000) . He is the first player to win 14 grand slam men's singles titles, since surpassed by Federer, Rafael Nadal and Djokovic. His win–loss record in Grand Slam finals is unbeaten at 78% (14 wins in 18 finals) for players who have appeared in at least 10 Grand Slam finals. He is the only American male player to win more than 10 slams.

Grand Slam finals

Singles: 18 (14 titles, 4 runner-ups)

Other significant finals

Year-end championships finals

Singles: 6 (5 titles, 1 runner-up)

Grand Slam Cup

Singles: 3 (2 titles, 1 runner-up)

ATP Super 9 / ATP Masters Series finals

Singles: 19 (11 titles, 8 runner-ups)

Doubles: 1 (1 title)

Career finals

Singles: 88 (64 titles, 24 runner-ups)

Wins (64)

Runner-ups (24)

Doubles: 4 (2 titles, 2 runner-ups)

Team competition: 4 (2 titles, 2 runner-ups)
Wins (2)

Runners-up (2)

Singles performance timeline

1This event was held in Stockholm through 1994, Essen in 1995, and Stuttgart from 1996 through 2001.

Record against other players
Sampras' record against players who held a top 10 ranking, with those who reached No. 1 in bold

Andre Agassi (20–14)
Todd Martin (18–4)
Jim Courier (16–4)
Patrick Rafter (12–4)
Petr Korda (12–5)
Goran Ivanišević (12–6)
Boris Becker (12–7)
Michael Chang (12–8)
Yevgeny Kafelnikov (11–2)
Cédric Pioline (9–0)
Jonas Björkman (9–1)
Greg Rusedski (9–1)
Thomas Enqvist (9–2)
Thomas Muster (9–2)
Stefan Edberg (8–6)
Karol Kučera (7–1)
Mark Philippoussis (7–3)
Magnus Larsson (7–4)
Wayne Ferreira (7–6)
Tim Henman (6–1)
Andriy Medvedev (6–2)
Magnus Gustafsson (5–0)
Aaron Krickstein (5–1)
Tommy Haas (5–3)
Ivan Lendl (5–3)
Guy Forget (5–4)
Brad Gilbert (5–4)
Magnus Norman (4–1)
Marc Rosset (4–1)
Àlex Corretja (4–2)
Lleyton Hewitt (4–5) 
Michael Stich (4–5)
Richard Krajicek (4–6) 
Sebastien Grosjean (3–0)
Nicolás Lapentti (3–0)
John McEnroe (3–0)
Nicolas Kiefer (3–1)
Carlos Moyá (3–1)
Marat Safin (3–4) 
Guillermo Cañas (2–0)
Jimmy Connors (2–0)
Andrés Gómez (2–0)
Anders Järryd (2–0)
Alberto Mancini (2–0)
Marcelo Rios (2–0)
Thomas Johansson (2–1)
Gustavo Kuerten (2–1)
Emilio Sánchez (2–1)
Mats Wilander (2–1)
Henri Leconte (2–2)
Sergi Bruguera (2–3)
Jiří Novák (1–1)
Carlos Costa (1–1)
Kevin Curren (1–1)
Andy Roddick (1–2) 
Roger Federer (0–1)
Fernando González (0–1)
Miloslav Mečíř (0–1)
Yannick Noah (0–1)
Jay Berger (0–1)
Mikael Pernfors (0–2)

Players with winning records against Sampras (minimum 3 matches)
Richard Krajicek (4–6) 
Lleyton Hewitt (4–5) 
Michael Stich (4–5)
Marat Safin (3–4)
Sergi Bruguera (2–3) 
Paul Haarhuis (1–3) 
Max Mirnyi (1–2) 
Christo van Rensburg (1–2) 
Andy Roddick (1–2) 
Derrick Rostagno (1–2)

Top 10 wins

ATP Tour career earnings

Senior tour titles
2007: Champions Cup Boston - defeated Todd Martin 6–3, 5–7, [11–9] 
2007: The Championships at the Palisades - defeated Martin 6–3, 6–4
2007: Champions Cup Athens - defeated Martin 6–3, 1–6, [10–6]
2009: Champions Cup Boston - defeated John McEnroe 7–6(10), 6–4
2009: The Del Mar Development Champions Cup, Mexico - defeated Patrick Rafter 7–6(6), 6–4

External links
 
 
 
 

Tennis career statistics